The Michigan State Memorial is located on Union Avenue within the Vicksburg, Mississippi, National Military Park. The memorial is an obelisk made of white Bethel Granite that stands  in height. It cost $10,000 and was dedicated on November 10, 1916. The sculptor was Herbert Adams. The design features a female allegory of the Spirit of Michigan.  The inscription "MICHIGAN'S/TRIBUTE OF HONOR/TO HER SOLDIERS/WHO SERVED/IN THE CAMPAIGN/AND SIEGE/OF VICKSBURG" is carved on the front of the monument.

See also 
 List of Union Civil War monuments and memorials

References

1916 sculptures
Granite sculptures in the United States
Michigan culture
Obelisks in the United States
Union (American Civil War) monuments and memorials in Mississippi
Vicksburg National Military Park